John Corcoran may refer to:

John Corcoran (Medal of Honor) (1842–1919), American soldier who received the Medal of Honor for valor during the American Civil War
Jack Corcoran (1858–1935), American catcher in Major League Baseball
John Corcoran (baseball) (1873–1901), American infielder in Major League Baseball
John H. Corcoran (1897–1945), Massachusetts politician who served as the Mayor of Cambridge, Massachusetts
John Corcoran (author) (born 1937), American author and spokesman for literacy programs, who set up his own foundation to help people learn to read
John Corcoran (logician) (1937–2021), American philosopher and logician, University of Buffalo (SUNY)
John Corcoran (martial arts) (1948–2019), American non-fiction book author, newsstand magazine editor, screenwriter and martial arts historian
John Corcoran (Gaelic football selector) (1959–2016), Irish Gaelic games administrator
John Corcoran (wrongful conviction) (born c. 1971), British man convicted of the murder of Helen Gorrie and then released on appeal in contentious circumstances 
John Corcoran (attorney) (fl. from 1990s), former Clinton White House aide, former speechwriter in the California Governor's office, attorney, and blogger

See also
John Cochrane (disambiguation)